The 2015–16 Gonzaga Bulldogs women's basketball team represents Gonzaga University in the 2015–16 college basketball season. The Bulldogs (also informally referred to as the "Zags"), members of the West Coast Conference. The Bulldogs were led by second year head coach Lisa Fortier. The Zags play their home games at the McCarthey Athletic Center on the university campus in Spokane, Washington. They finished the season 19–14, 10–8 in WCC play to finish in fifth place. They lost in the quarterfinals of the WCC women's basketball tournament to Santa Clara. They were invited to the Women's National Invitation Tournament where they defeated UC Riverside in the first round before losing to Utah in the second round.

Roster

Schedule

|-
!colspan=9 style="background:#002469; color:white;"| Exhibition

|-
!colspan=9 style="background:#002469; color:white;"| Non-conference regular season

|-
!colspan=9 style="background:#002469; color:white;"| WCC regular season

|-
!colspan=9 style="background:#002965; color:white;"| WCC Women's Tournament

|-
!colspan=9 style="background:#002965; color:white;"| WNIT

Rankings
2015–16 NCAA Division I women's basketball rankings

See also
2015–16 Gonzaga Bulldogs men's basketball team
Gonzaga Bulldogs women's basketball

References

Gonzaga
Gonzaga
Gonzaga
Gonzaga Bulldogs women's basketball seasons
2016 Women's National Invitation Tournament participants